"Fool for You" is a song by American soul singer CeeLo Green from his third studio album, The Lady Killer. The song was solicited to radio as the album's third single on March 8, 2011. The single version of the track features guest vocals from Canadian singer Melanie Fiona; the album version, however, features vocals from American singer Philip Bailey. No music video was released for the song.

At the 54th Grammy Awards, "Fool for You" won in two categories: Best Traditional R&B Performance and Best R&B Song.

Background
Green first premiered the new version of "Fool for You", featuring vocals from Fiona, by making it available as a free download via his official Facebook page. The song was released as a digital download and a CD single, with both releases featuring the song "Bridges", previously only available as an Amazon MP3 digital download.
A demo was originally done by Jamie Foxx for his album Best Night of My Life

Critical reception
Joshua Klein of Pitchfork said Cee Lo Green "happily shares (the spotlight) with Earth, Wind & Fire's Philip Bailey on "Fool For You"."
Andy Kellman of Allmusic wrote "The infectiously beaming "Fool for You," served with a choppy gait, carries as much pride as Ray Charles' "A Fool for You." Jody Rosen of Rolling Stone found that "Fool for You” slides from silken ballad to gospel funk." Mike Diver of the BBC acclaimed "Fool for You is the closest an artist of today will come to capturing the magic that made Marvin Gaye such a captivating talent."

Track listing
CD single
 "Fool for You" (featuring Melanie Fiona) - 3:45
 "Bridges" - 4:07

Charts

Weekly charts

Year-end charts

Credits and personnel
Lead vocals – Cee Lo Green
Producers – Jack Splash
Songwriters – Callaway, Hallim, Jack Splash
Label: Elektra Records

Release history

References

2011 singles
CeeLo Green songs
Grammy Award for Best Traditional R&B Vocal Performance
Melanie Fiona songs
Songs written by CeeLo Green
2010 songs
Songs written by Jack Splash
Elektra Records singles
Soul ballads
2010s ballads